Špiro Peričić (born 8 October 1993) is a Croatian football defender.

Club career
As a youth, Peričić trained with Hajduk Split. After making several stops with clubs in the lower Croatian divisions, Peričić signed with top flight Slaven Belupo in early 2015.

Peričić signed a three-year deal with Maribor in April 2019 after moving from Croatia to Slovenia to play with Mura. The announcement of his signing before the end of the season meant that Mura dropped him from the first team as a result, even though his contract with the club was ending. Peričić scored in his debut game for Maribor in the 2019–20 UEFA Champions League first qualifying round match against Valur. His contract with Maribor was mutually terminated on 12 August 2021.

International career
In 2011, Peričić made three appearances for the Croatian under-18 team.

References

External links
NZS profile 
Soccerway profile

1993 births
Living people
Footballers from Split, Croatia
Croatian footballers
Croatia youth international footballers
Association football defenders
HNK Hajduk Split players
NK Primorac 1929 players
NK Solin players
NK Dugopolje players
NK Slaven Belupo players
HNK Cibalia players
NŠ Mura players
NK Maribor players
Sabah FC (Azerbaijan) players
First Football League (Croatia) players
Croatian Football League players
Slovenian PrvaLiga players
Azerbaijan Premier League players
Croatian expatriate footballers
Croatian expatriate sportspeople in Slovenia
Expatriate footballers in Slovenia
Croatian expatriate sportspeople in Azerbaijan
Expatriate footballers in Azerbaijan